Behnam is an Iranian / Persian masculine given name or family name, which translates as "distinguished, honorable, reputable, or acclaimed".

The name is composed of two parts: bih (به, meaning "good" or "best") and nâm (نام, meaning "name or reputation").

Persian masculine given names